Todok or Todog, known in Chinese as Tuotuo Township, is a rural township in Jinghe County in Xinjiang, the northwestern province of the China.

In the early 19th century, it was recorded as the northwestern boundary of the sandy desert in Xinjiang.

References

Populated places in Xinjiang